Tumor protein D54 is a protein that in humans is encoded by the TPD52L2 gene.

Model organisms

Model organisms have been used in the study of TPD52L2 function. A conditional knockout mouse line, called Tpd52l2tm1a(KOMP)Wtsi was generated as part of the International Knockout Mouse Consortium program—a high-throughput mutagenesis project to generate and distribute animal models of disease to interested scientists.

Male and female animals underwent a standardized phenotypic screen to determine the effects of deletion.

Twenty two tests were carried out on mutant mice and one significant abnormality was observed: homozygous adult females displayed a decrease in body length by DEXA.

Interactions 

TPD52L2 has been shown to interact with TPD52L1 and TPD52.

Cellular function 

TPD52L2 has a role in membrane traffic. TPD52L2 is found on small transport vesicles, termed intracellular nanovesicles, that transfer proteins between different cellular compartments. When TPD52L2 is depleted from HeLa cells, the following trafficking pathways are impaired: anterograde traffic, recycling of cargo and Golgi integrity. Proteomic analysis indicates that TPD52L2 is one of the most abundant proteins expressed in HeLa cells.

References

Further reading 

 
 
 
 
 
 
 
 
 
 

Genes mutated in mice